"I'm Sorry" is a song written and recorded by American country-folk singer-songwriter John Denver. Released in 1975, it was his final number-one pop hit released during his career.

Cash Box said it "is replete with the classic Denver touches: sweet arrangement by Lee Holdridge, and emotive lyrics."

Chart performance
The song, which is an apology for forsaken love, "I'm Sorry" reached number one on the Billboard Hot 100 chart on September 27, 1975, as well as reaching number one on the Easy Listening chart. Six weeks after topping the pop chart, the song was Denver's third and final number one on the  Billboard Hot Country Singles chart.

The flip side of "I'm Sorry" was "Calypso", and, like its A-side, enjoyed substantial radio airplay on Top 40 stations.

Weekly charts

Year-end charts

All-time charts

References

1975 singles
John Denver songs
Billboard Hot 100 number-one singles
Cashbox number-one singles
RCA Records singles
RPM Top Singles number-one singles
Songs written by John Denver
Song recordings produced by Milt Okun
Torch songs
1975 songs